The 1997–98 English Premiership (known as the Allied Dunbar Premiership for sponsorship reasons) was the eleventh full season of rugby union within the top tier of the English rugby union system.

Newcastle Falcons won the league, for the first time, following their promotion from National Division 2 last season. Saracens finished just one point behind in second place, and the last placed club, Bristol, were relegated.

Participating teams and locations

Notes

Final table

Fixtures

Week 1

Week 2

Week 3

Week 4

Week 5

Week 6

Week 7

Week 8

Week 9

Week 10

Week 11

Week 12

Week 13

Week 14

Week 15

Week 16

Week 17

Week 18

Week 19

Week 20

Week 21

Week 22

Week 23

Week 24

Week 25

Week 26

Sponsorship
Following ten years of sponsorship by the Courage Brewery, the life assurance group Allied Dunbar agreed to sponsor the top two divisions for £7,500,000.

Leading scorers
Note: Flags to the left of player names indicate national team as has been defined under World Rugby eligibility rules, or primary nationality for players who did not earn international senior caps. Players may hold one or more non-WR nationalities.

Most points 
Source:

Most tries
Source:

Attendances

See also
 English rugby union system
 History of the English rugby union system

References

External links
 Official site

1997-98
 
England